Underdog Victorious is the sixth studio album by American singer-songwriter Jill Sobule, released in 2004. (see 2004 in music). As of February 2005, the album had sold 7,300 copies. Her first record in four years, the album contains the single "Cinnamon Park" (which borrows the piano hook of the 1972 single "Saturday in the Park" from the band Chicago).

The CD contains a hidden track, "I Saw a Cop."

"Nothing Natural" appeared on an episode of the FX drama series Nip/Tuck, and a live, acoustic rendition of "Freshman" appeared in the film Mind the Gap.

Tim Cain of the Herald & Review named the album the 3rd best of 2004.

Track listing
"Freshman" (Eaton, Sobule) – 2:21
"Jetpack" (Eaton, Sobule) – 3:03
"Cinnamon Park" (Eaton, Lamm, Sobule) – 3:23
"Tender Love" (Demain, Eaton, Sobule) – 2:46
"Underdog Victorious" (Eaton, Sobule) – 3:31
"Under the Disco Ball" (Sobule) – 1:31
"The Last Line" (Eaton, Sobule) – 3:56
"Tel Aviv" (Eaton, Sobule) – 3:32
"Joey" (Demain, Sobule) – 3:55
"Nothing Natural" (Eaton, Sobule) – 2:28
"Angel/Asshole" (Sobule) – 2:59
"Strawberry Gloss" (Sobule) – 3:45
"Thank Misery" (Eaton, Sobule) – 2:16
"I Saw a Cop" [hidden track] (Sobule) – 2:31
"Almost Fell" [Borders Bonus Track] – 3:33

Personnel
Jill Sobule – organ, guitar, drums, sound effects, Moog synthesizer, omnichord, Casio
Patrick Buchanon – guitar
Rob Burger – piano, Casio
Chris Carmichael – violin, viola
Bill DeMain – electric piano, background vocals
Dennis Diken – drums
Robin Eaton – bass guitar, harmonica, background vocals
Mickey Grimm – percussion, drums
David Henry – cello
Jim Hoke – clarinet, flute
Brad Jones – organ, bass, piano, rhythm guitar, electric piano
Will Kimbrough – slide guitar
Marykate O'Neil – background vocals
Al Perkins – pedal steel
Michael Rhodes – bass
Ross Rice – piano
Neal Rosengarden – trumpet, classical guitar

Production
Producers: Robin Eaton, Brad Jones, Roger Moutenot
Engineer: Chris Woods
Mastering: Jim DeMain

References

Jill Sobule albums
2004 albums
Artemis Records albums
Albums produced by Brad Jones (musician)
Albums produced by Roger Moutenot